Kirodimal Govt. Polytechnic, Raigarh (KGP Raigarh) is a government-run technical institute located in Raigarh, Chhattisgarh, India. It was established in 1956, it is affiliated to Chhattisgarh Swami Vivekanand Technical University. It is one of the oldest Polytechnic in india.

The institute offers diploma in civil engineering, electrical engineering, mechanical engineering, computer science and engineering and electronics and telecommunication engineering and metallurgical engineering.

History
KGP Raigarh was established in 1956, it was inaugurated by the first President of India Rajendra Prasad.

Departments
The institute has the following departments:
Computer Science
Civil Engineering
Electrical Engineering
Electronics and Telecommunication Engineering
Mechanical Engineering
Metallurgy
Physics
Chemistry

References

Engineering colleges in Chhattisgarh
Educational institutions established in 1956
1956 establishments in Madhya Pradesh